

Medieval
 Khosrovidukht (8th century)
 Sahakdukht (8th century)
 Nerses IV the Gracious (ca.1102–1173)
 Mekhitar of Ayrivank (ca.1230–ca.1300)

Baroque
 Paghtasar Dpir (1683–1768)

Classical era
 Hampartsoum Limondjian (1768–1839)

Romantic
 Karol Mikuli (1819–1897)
 Dikran Tchouhadjian (1837–1898)
 Makar Ekmalyan (1856–1905)
 Nikoghayos Tigranian (1856–1951)
 Kemani Tatyos Ekserciyan (1858–1913)
 Stéphan Elmas (1862–1937)
 Komitas (1869–1935)
 Alexander Spendiaryan (1871–1928)
 Edgar Manas (1875–1964)
 Grikor Suni (1876–1939)
 Armen Tigranian (1879–1950)
 Romanos Melikian (1883–1935)
 Sargis Barkhudaryan (1887–1973)

Modern/Contemporary

 Anton Mailyan (1880–1942)

 Nicol Galanderian (1881–1944)
 Schahan Berberian (1891–1956)
 Sergei Aslamazyan (1897–1978)
 Artemi Ayvazyan (1902–1975)
 Aram Khachaturian (1903–1978)
 Kurken Alemshah (1907–1947) 
 Koharik Gazarossian (1907–1967)
 Grigor Yeghiazaryan (1908–1998)
 Sirvart Kalpakyan Karamanuk (1912–2008)
 Gayane C'ebotaryan (1918–1998)
 Ghazaros (Lazar) Saryan (1920–1998)
 Karen Khachaturian (1920–2011)
 Alexander Arutiunian (1920–2012)
 Arno Babajanian (1921–1983)
 Adam Khudoyan (1921–2000)
 Edvard Mirzoyan (1921–2012)
 Edvard Baghdasaryan (1922–1987)
 Boris Parsadanian (1925–1997)
 Khachatur Avetisyan (1926–1996)
 Garbis Aprikian (born 1926)
 Konstantin Orbelyan (1928–2014)
 Geghuni Hovannesi Chitchian (born 1929)
 Avet Terterian (1929–1994)
 Edgar Hovhannisyan (1930–1998)
 Iosif Andriasov (1933–2000)
 Loris Ohannes Chobanian (born 1933)
 Izabella Arazova (born 1936)
 Tigran Mansurian (born 1939)
 Sahan Arzruni (born 1943)
 Levon Chaushian (born 1946)
 Aram Satian (born 1947)
 Vartan Adjemian (born 1956)
 Vache Sharafyan (born 1966)
 Artur Avanesov (born 1980)
 Vahram Sargsyan (born 1981)

Armenia

Armenian